Phillip Harvey (born 28 February 1964, London, England), known as Daddae Harvey or only Daddae, is an English guitarist, percussionist and keyboardist formerly with Soul II Soul. He was one of the founding members of the group and co-wrote some of the tracks on their albums. They had a No. 1 UK hit with "Back to Life (However Do You Want Me)".

References

1964 births
Living people
British contemporary R&B singers
English pop guitarists
English keyboardists
English drummers
English people of Barbadian descent
Soul II Soul members